Otto Knud Johan Axel Moltke (10 July 1897 – 13 September 1952) was a Danish footballer who played as a defender. He made one appearance for the Denmark national team in 1919.

References

External links
 
 

1897 births
1952 deaths
Danish men's footballers
Association football defenders
Denmark international footballers
Akademisk Boldklub players
Footballers from Copenhagen